Gabriel Amigo III (born 1 June 1991) is a Filipino Enduro mountain bike athlete who is currently residing in Bislig, Philippines. He was crowned as the National Enduro Champion for men's elite category after winning the 2017 Philippine MTB Enduro National Championships held in Guimaras, Philippines. Amigo signed for a 1 year contract deal with GT Bicycles Philippines and he will be riding with the GT Force AL Comp 27.5 2021 edition.

He is the first Filipino elite rider who was able to compete at the 2019 Enduro World Series in Rotorua, New Zealand (Round 1) and Derby, Tasmania (Round 2). Currently he is ranked as 200th in the enduro world series standing and a qualified rider to represent for his country in the Enduro World Series - Trophy of Nations 2019 race in Finale Ligure, Italy.

Amigo recently snatched the 3rd place spot in the 2021 UCI Philippine National Downhill Trials held in Danao City, Cebu last November 28, 2021.

References

 UCI Philippine National Downhill Trials 2021 cebudailynews.inquirer.net. 29 November 2021. Retrieved 1 December 2021
 International Chiang Mai Enduro 2019 www.enduroworldseries.com. 30 November 2019. Retrieved 5 March 2020
 Race Report: Yak Ru Enduro - An Enduro On The Roof of The World in Nepal www.pinkbike.com. 21 November 2019. Retrieved 5 March 2020
 Trophy of Nations Qualified Riders 2019 www.enduroworldseries.com. 21 August 2019. Retrieved 23 August 2019
 Podiums and Pandemonium’s – IME 2019 Race Report moabpinas.org.  7 August 2019. Retrieved 23 August 2019
 Pinkbike Start List - EWS Rotorua 2019 www.pinkbike.com. 23 March 2019. Retrieved 23 August 2019
 SBS Radio - Philippine rider to compete for Enduro World Series in Australia www.sbs.com.au 29 November 2019. Retrieved 23 August 2019
 Universe.com - Singapore Open Enduro 2018 www.universe.com. 30 June 2019. Retrieved 23 August 2019
 2017 Philippine MTB Enduro National Championships www.pressreader.com. 20 April 2017. Retrieved 23 August 2019
 Asia News Network - Gabriel stuns own idol to win Royal Brunei Enduro annx.asianews.network. 2 October 2017. Retrieved 23 August 2019
 Manggahan MTB Enduro Race: Guimaras Island enduro-mtb.com. 23 May 2016. Retrieved 23 August 2019
 Asian Enduro Series: Round 2 in Calape, Bohol enduro-mtb.com 19 September 2016. Retrieved 23 August 2019

External links
Gabriel Amigo III - Enduro World Series

1991 births
Living people
Filipino male cyclists
People from Surigao del Sur